Desmond "Des" McNulty (born 28 July 1952), is a Scottish Labour Party politician, who served as the Member of the Scottish Parliament (MSP) for the Clydebank and Milngavie constituency from 1999 to 2011, serving as Labour's Shadow Cabinet Secretary for Education and Lifelong Learning until he was defeated at the 2011 election.

Early life and career
McNulty studied at St Bede's College, Manchester and graduated from the University of York in social sciences in 1974.
Before entering the Scottish Parliament, he worked at Glasgow Caledonian University as a sociologist, later becoming head of strategic planning.

He served as Deputy Minister for Social Justice from 2002 to 2003, but was replaced after the 2003 election. He returned to ministerial office in November 2006 as Deputy Communities Minister.

On becoming leader of Labour in the Scottish Parliament in September 2008, Iain Gray appointed McNulty Shadow Minister for Transport, Infrastructure and Climate Change. McNulty also served on the Scottish Parliament Transport, Infrastructure and Climate Change Committee. On 27 October 2009 he was appointed Shadow Cabinet Secretary for Education and Lifelong Learning by Iain Gray. He is married and has two sons.

References

External links 
 

1952 births
Living people
People from Stockport
Alumni of the University of York
Labour MSPs
Members of the Scottish Parliament 1999–2003
Members of the Scottish Parliament 2003–2007
Members of the Scottish Parliament 2007–2011